Operation Yoav (also called Operation Ten Plagues or Operation Yo'av) was an Israeli military operation carried out from 15–22 October 1948 in the Negev Desert, during the 1948 Arab–Israeli War. Its goal was to drive a wedge between the Egyptian forces along the coast and the Beersheba–Hebron–Jerusalem road, and ultimately to conquer the whole Negev. Operation Yoav was headed by the Southern Front commander Yigal Allon. The operation was named after Yitzhak Dubno, codenamed "Yoav" by his commanders in the Palmach. Dubno, a senior Palmach officer, was charged with planning and leading the defense of the kibbutzim Negba and Yad Mordechai. Dubno was killed in an air raid on Kibbutz Negba shortly after Egyptian forces began their offensive on Israel's southern front.

Background
In the central and northern parts of Palestine, the Israelis had managed to make substantial territorial gains before the second truce of the war went into effect. But the southern Negev Desert, allocated to a Jewish state in the 1947 United Nations Partition Plan for Palestine, was still under Egyptian control. Despite the second truce, the Egyptians denied Jewish convoys passage through to the Negev, and captured positions beyond the truce demarcation lines.

Operation Ten Plagues (after the punishment God sent to the Egyptians for holding the Israelis captive in the Hebrew Bible) was made and approved at a Cabinet Session 6 October 1948. The operation came after at 14 October 1948 when a convoy consisting of 16 trucks was fired on as it passed through Egyptian positions.

Ralph Bunche, who had become UN mediator after the assassination of Count Folke Bernadotte, said:

[The Israeli] military action of the last few days has been on a scale which could only be undertaken after considerable preparation, and could scarcely be explained as simple retaliatory action for an attack on an [Israeli] convoy.

The Operation coincided with Operation ha-Har, 18–24 October, in which the Harel and Etzioni Brigades attacked Egyptian controlled villages along the Jerusalem Corridor.

History

The Israeli forces consisted of three infantry brigades, the Negev Brigade, the Givati Brigade under the command of Abraham "Kiki" Elkin, and the Yiftach Brigade, an armored battalion from the 8th Armored Brigade and the largest artillery formation that had been available to the IDF at the time. On October 18 the Oded Brigade also joined in the operation. In the evening of October 15 the Israeli Air Force bombed Gaza, al-Majdal (now Ashkelon), Beersheba and Beit Hanoun. Some targets were bombed again during the following two nights. A battalion of the Yiftach Brigade mined the railroad between El-Arish and Rafah and various roads in the Gaza area, also driving a wedge into the road. Two battalions of the Givati Brigade drove south east of Iraq al-Manshiyya (now Kiryat Gath), thus cutting the road between al-Faluja and Bayt Jibrin. Beit Jibrin was captured by the 52 Battalion of Givati and the 8th Brigade on October 23.

In the early morning hours of October 21, following two nights of air raids, the Negev Brigade and 8th Armored Brigade attacked Beersheba from the west. Another force joined them from the north. The Egyptian army garrison consisted of 500 soldiers with some light artillery. They put up some resistance for five hours before surrendering. The conquest of Beersheba was named Operation Moshe, after Moshe Albert, who fell defending the besieged Beit Eshel.

While a truce was ordered for 15:00 hours on 22 October, action in the days immediately following the operation, and associated with it, continued.

After the Egyptians retreated southward from Ashdod (October 28) and al-Majdal (November 6) to Gaza, the coastal strip down to Yad Mordechai was occupied by Israeli forces. On 9 November, the Iraq Suwaydan fortress was captured and renamed the Yoav Fortress in honor of the operation.

On 29 October soldiers from the 8th Brigade carried out a massacre at al-Dawayima.

Towards the end of the operation General Allon sought permission to launch an attack on the Hebron hills and into the Jericho valley. David Ben-Gurion refused, mainly due to fears that this would lead to British involvement.

The United Nations Refugee Relief Project reported that the Gaza Strip's refugee population had jumped from 100,000 to 230,000 as a result of Operation Yoav. This figure does not include those who fled to the Hebron Hills.

Captured Arab villages

Participating brigades
 8th Armored Brigade
 Givati Brigade
 Negev Brigade
 Oded Brigade
 Yiftach Brigade

See also
 Israeli naval campaign in Operation Yoav
 List of battles and operations in the 1948 Palestine war
 Depopulated Palestinian locations in Israel

References

External links
 The First Israeli-Arab War and its Refugees 1948–53 
 Lest We Forget - an article by Nizar Sakhanini

Yoav
1948 in Israel
1948 in All-Palestine (Gaza)
Yoav
October 1948 events in Asia